The men's shot put event  at the 1998 European Athletics Indoor Championships was held on 28 February.

Medalists

Results

Qualification

Final

References

Qualification results
Final results

Shot put at the European Athletics Indoor Championships
Shot